Alkalihalobacillus haemicentroti is a Gram-positive, moderately halophilic, facultatively alkaliphilic, endospore-forming, facultatively anaerobic and non-motile bacterium from the genus of Alkalihalobacillus which has been isolated from a sea urchin (Hemicentrotus pulcherrimus) from the Naozhou Island.

References

Bacillaceae
Bacteria described in 2011